Detlef Schößler (born 3 October 1962) is a former East German international footballer who became a coach.

The defender appeared in 319 top-flight matches in East and the reunified Germany.

Schößler won 18 caps for East Germany between 1986 and 1990.

References

External links
 
 
 

1962 births
Living people
German footballers
East German footballers
East Germany international footballers
Association football defenders
1. FC Magdeburg players
Dynamo Dresden players
1. FC Lokomotive Leipzig players
1. FC Lokomotive Leipzig managers
DDR-Oberliga players
German football managers
Sportspeople from Magdeburg
Footballers from Saxony-Anhalt
People from Bezirk Magdeburg